Acrobasis obtusella is a species of snout moth in the genus Acrobasis. It was described by Jacob Hübner in 1796. It is found in most of Europe.

The wingspan is 15–17 mm.

The larvae feed on Pyrus species. They feed on the tissues of the leaf which they fold irregularly.

References

Moths described in 1796
Acrobasis
Moths of Europe